Justin Stefan Swart (born 23 July 1972) is a former South African rugby union player.

Playing career
Swart received his schooling at Paul Roos Gymnasium in Stellenbosch and was selected for the  schools team that competed at the annual Craven Week tournament in 1990 and 1991. In 1991 he was selected for the South African schools team and after school he enrolled at Stellenbosch University for a degree in physical education. Swart made his provincial debut for  against  in 1993 and represented the union 93 times and also equalled Carel du Plessis' record during the 1997 season, scoring 25 tries for the season.

At the end of 1997 he toured with the Springboks to Europe. In addition to the 10 Test matches he played, he also played three tour matches and scored 2 tries for the Springboks.

Test history

See also
List of South Africa national rugby union players – Springbok no. 630

References

1972 births
Living people
South African rugby union players
South Africa international rugby union players
Western Province (rugby union) players
Stormers players
Sharks (Currie Cup) players
Sharks (rugby union) players
Alumni of Paul Roos Gymnasium
Stellenbosch University alumni
Rugby union fullbacks
Rugby union wings
Rugby union players from the Western Cape